The Darial Gorge (Darialis Kheoba; ; , Arvykom;  , Dära Äle; Chechen: Теркан чӀаж, Terkan ch'azh)  is a river gorge on the border between Russia and Georgia. It is at the east base of Mount Kazbek, south of present-day Vladikavkaz.

In history 
The Darial originates from Dar-i Alān meaning "Gate of the Alans" in Persian. The Alans held the lands north of the pass in the first centuries AD. It has been fortified in ancient times by the Romans and Persians; the fortification was variously known as the Iberian Gates or the Caucasian Gates. The pass is mentioned in the Georgian annals under the names of Darialani; Strabo calls it Porta Caucasica and Porta Cumana; Ptolemy, Fortes Sarmatica; it was sometimes known as Porta Caucasica and Portae Caspiae (a name bestowed also on the "gate" or pass beside the Caspian Sea at Derbent); and the Tatars call it Darioly.

Josephus wrote that Alexander the Great built iron gates at an unspecified pass which some Latin and Greek authors identified with Darial.

Darial Pass fell into Sassanid hands in 252–253, when the Sassanid Empire conquered and annexed Iberia. The control of the Darial Pass switched to the Western Turkic Kaganate in 628, when Tong Yabgu Kagan signed a treaty with Iberia, transferring over to the Kaganate the control of all its cities and fortresses, and establishing free trade. Control of Darial Pass switched to the Arab Rashidun Caliphate in 644. Afterwards, it was controlled by the Kingdom of Georgia. There was a battle point between the Ilkhanate and the Golden Horde, then indirectly controlled by Safavids and Qajar state, until it was captured by Russian Empire after annexation of Kingdom of Georgia in 1801–1830. It remained a strategic Russian forepost under Russian control until the dismemberment of the Soviet Union.

Importance 
The Darial Pass was historically important as one of only two crossings of the Caucasus mountain range, the other being the Derbent Pass. As a result, Darial Gorge has been fortified since at least 150 BC. Ruins of an ancient fortress are still visible. The pass served as a hub point for many roads connecting North and South Caucasus and remained open for traffic for most of its existence.

The gorge has been immortalized in Russian poetry, notably by Lermontov in The Demon; it has become known as one of the most romantic places in the Caucasus.

As the main border crossing between Georgia Russia, it has been the site of Russians fleeing conscription for the Russo-Ukrainian War.

See also
 Gates of Alexander
Iberian Gates

Notes

References

Bibliography

Further reading
 

Canyons and gorges of Georgia (country)
Georgia (country)–Russia border
Canyons and gorges of Russia
Sasanian defense lines